Rita Celli (born 1969 in Sudbury, Ontario) is a Canadian radio journalist, currently the host since 2006 of Ontario Today on CBC Radio One's stations in Ontario. During her tenure, the show has earned a number of awards including three Gracie Awards for Outstanding Talk Show (2013, 2011, 2010), a Gabriel Award in the News and Informational Local Release category (2011), the Sam Ross Award for Editorial Writing/Commentary from the Radio Television News Directors Association (2009) and a silver medal in the International Breaking News category at the New York Festival (2008).

In 2014, Celli was awarded the prestigious Michener-Deacon Fellowship for Investigative Journalism.

In 2000, she and a team of CBC journalists won an investigative award from the Canadian Association of Journalists.

Prior to Ontario Today, Rita held a number of positions at CBC on both radio and television, including anchor of CBC Ottawa's supper hour news.

Born and raised in Sudbury, Ontario, she graduated from Carleton University’s journalism program in 1991.

References

External links
 CBC profile

1960s births
Living people
Canadian people of Italian descent
Canadian radio news anchors
Canadian talk radio hosts
Canadian television news anchors
Canadian television reporters and correspondents
Carleton University alumni
CBC Radio hosts
CBC Television people
Journalists from Ontario
People from Greater Sudbury
Canadian women radio journalists
Canadian women television journalists
Canadian women radio hosts